Aparna Sanyal is an Indian director and producer. She has directed multiple films, and produced several international documentary-series. She runs Mixed Media Productions, a production house based in Delhi, and is one of the co-founders of The Carbon Union, a creative collective.

Education 
Aparna pursued Mass Communication from A.J.K. Mass Communication Research Centre at Jamia Millia Islamia, New Delhi.

Filmography and contributions 
She directed A Drop of Sunshine, a film about Reshma Valliappan's journey with schizophrenia. Her other films include Tedhi Lakeer - The Crooked Line, a film about two gay men in India; The Monks who won the Grammy, about the history, mythology and philosophy of Vajrayana Buddhism; Shovana, about the celebrated Kathak dancer and guru, Shovana Narayan and One Mustard Seed, on death and dying.

She also directed Shunyata - When Kathak met Cham, a film about a performance in 2014 called Shunyata, where monks of a Buddhist monastery, Palpung Sherabling Monastic Seat, and the doyen of Kathak, the Indian classical dance form, Shovana Narayan came together to create a ballet on popular stories from Buddhist mythology.

She was also the programming head of the Delhi bureau of Times Now for about three years, from 2005 to 2008.

She has been a producer and line producer for several international documentary series filmed in India, including IRT - Deadliest Roads, a 10-part series for History, and The Real Marigold Hotel, a series for BBC 2.

Aparna was part of a group of filmmakers who ran 'FD Zone' in Delhi, a monthly screening of documentaries at the India Habitat Centre in Delhi.

Awards and recognitions 
National Award for directing A Drop of Sunshine.
National Award for the Best Educational Film in 2012. 
A Drop of Sunshine also won 5 awards at the Indian Documentary Producers' Association (IDPA) Awards in 2010. 
recognised as a 'Creative Entrepreneur' by the British Council in 2010.

References

Year of birth missing (living people)
Living people
Jamia Millia Islamia alumni
Indian women film directors
Indian women film producers